Chapter 11, Title 11, United States Code is a component of United States bankruptcy laws.

Chapter 11 or Chapter Eleven may also refer to:
 "Chapter 11" (House of Cards), an episode of House of Cards
 "Chapter 11" (Legion), an episode of Legion
 "Chapter 11: The Heiress", an episode of The Mandalorian
 Chapter Eleven (album), an album by Michael Lee Firkins